Elfin may refer to:

ELFIN, a CubeSat developed by University of California, Los Angeles
Elfin (steamboat), a steamboat that ran on Lake Washington from 1891 to 1900
Elfin of Alt Clut, ruler of Alt Clut, seventh century Scotland
Elfin, a character from the video game The Peace Keepers
Elfin forests, dwarfed plant ecosystems
Elfin rabbit, a domestic rabbit breed
Elfin Sports Cars, an Australian sports car manufacturer
Elfin Team, a hacking group
, one of several British Royal Navy ships
, one of several United States Navy ships
Elfins, North American members of the butterfly genus Callophrys

See also

Elf
Elphin (disambiguation)
Elven (disambiguation)
Williams syndrome, a syndrome characterized by an elfin facial appearance